Juan Reyes (born 16 May 1944) is a former Cuban cyclist. He competed in the men's sprint and the men's tandem events at the 1968 Summer Olympics.

References

1944 births
Living people
Cuban male cyclists
Olympic cyclists of Cuba
Cyclists at the 1968 Summer Olympics
Sportspeople from Havana